Anthony Eugene Rubino (June 20, 1921 – November 30, 1983) was an American football player. 

A native of Elizabeth, Pennsylvania, Rubino attended Elizabeth Forward High School.  He played college football at Wake Forest where he was a member of Sigma Pi fraternity.

He played professional football in the National Football League (NFL) as a guard for the Detroit Lions in 1943 and 1946. He appeared in 21 NFL games, six as a starter. 

In 1944 and 1945, during World War II, he served with the U.S. Navy.

References

1921 births
1983 deaths
Wake Forest Demon Deacons football players
Detroit Lions players
Players of American football from Pennsylvania
United States Navy personnel of World War II
People from Elizabeth, Pennsylvania